Mikawa may refer to:

Places in Japan
 Mikawa Province, an old province of Japan
 Mikawa, Yamagata, a town in Yamagata Prefecture
 Mikawa, Ishikawa, former town in Ishikawa Prefecture
 Mikawa, Kumamoto, former town in Kumamoto Prefecture
 Mikawa, Yamaguchi, former town in Yamaguchi Prefecture
 Mikawa, Ehime, former village in Ehime Prefecture
 Mikawa, Niigata, former village in Niigata Prefecture

Surname
 Gunichi Mikawa, admiral in the Imperial Japanese Navy during World War II
 Kenichi Mikawa, Japanese TV star, comedian and singer

Other uses
Mikawa dialect, dialect of Japanese spoken in Mikawa Province in eastern Aichi Prefecture. It is also known as "Mikawa-ben"

See also 

Mikawa Station (disambiguation)

Japanese-language surnames